Gary J. Shapiro is an acclaimed author, lobbyist, and the president and CEO of the Consumer Technology Association which represents over 1500 consumer technology companies and owns and produces the Consumer Electronics Show (CES). Shapiro is the author of the bestselling books Ninja Future: Secrets to Success in the New World of Innovation (William Morrow, 2019), Ninja Innovation: The Ten Killer Strategies of the World’s Most Successful Businesses (William Morrow, 2013)  and The Comeback: How Innovation Will Restore the American Dream (Beaufort Books, 2011).  Through these books, media interviews, and opinion pieces in publications such as The Wall Street Journal, The New York Times and The Washington Post, Shapiro explains the economic importance of innovation. He is considered an “influencer" on LinkedIn, and is a speaker at conferences including DLD, Milken, The Next Web and SXSW.

Career

Shapiro holds a Juris Doctor degree from the Georgetown University Law Center. He is a graduate of the Binghamton University, where he majored in economics and psychology.

Shapiro was an associate at the law firm of Squire, Sanders and Dempsey. He also worked as a legislative aide on Capitol Hill.

Shapiro helped found and chaired the HDTV Model Station, and has served on the board of the Advanced Television Test Center. He co-founded and chaired the HDTV Model Station, served as a leader of the Advanced Television Test Center (ATTC) and is a charter inductee to the Academy of Digital Television Pioneers, receiving its highest award as the industry leader most influential in advancing HDTV.

Shapiro is chairman of the Home Recording Rights Coalition.

While Shapiro was at Georgetown, J. Edward Day, a senior partner at Squire, began to mentor Shapiro. He instructed Shapiro to begin monitoring developments in the Sony case. The case was filed to prevent Sony and retailers from making and selling video cassette recorders.  The decision by the Ninth Circuit against Sony spurred a group of retailers, consumer groups and manufacturers, such as 3M, General Electric and RCA, to start weekly meetings in order to coordinate their fight against the verdict. These meetings quickly resulted in the creation of the HRRC. As chairman of the coalition, Shapiro has testified before Congress and has helped ensure the growth of the video rental market, VCRs, home computers, and audio-recording equipment, including MP3 technology.

Public service and recognition
Gary Shapiro was recognized in 2021 with the Légion d'Honneur (Legion of Honor) at the Rank of Chevalier by President Emmanuel Macron, recognizing his service in spearheading the transition to a technology-forward society and organizing CES. He was just the second American to receive this award in 2021. Shapiro testified on a Senate Commerce, Science & Transportation Committee hearing on the risks to innovation caused by over-regulation. He has been named a "Tech Titan" by Washingtonian magazine. In 2015, 2016, and 2017, The Hill named Shapiro “one of the most influential lobbyists” in Washington, D.C.  In 2015, Shapiro was named one of DC Inno's 50 on Fire of DC Government and Advocacy. Shapiro has been repeatedly named one of the 100 most influential people in Washington by Washington Life magazine and a Tech Titan by Washingtonian magazine. He was inducted into the Academy of Digital Television Pioneers and in 2003 received its highest award as the industry leader most influential in advancing HDTV. He has held many exhibition industry leadership posts and received the IAEE Pinnacle Award. In 2004, the Anti-Defamation League honored Shapiro with its American Heritage Award at its annual dinner in recognition of his "long commitment to the humanitarian goals of civil rights and justice."

Shapiro sits on the State Department's Advisory Committee on International Communications and Information Policy, the No Labels Executive Council, the USO of Metropolitan Washington-Baltimore Board of Directors and the American Enterprise Institute Global Internet Strategy Advisory Board. He has served on the board of directors of the Northern Virginia Technology Council, the Economic Club of Washington, the Commonwealth of Virginia's Commission on Information Technology, which created policy positions for using the internet as a medium for business, and on the Board of Visitors of George Mason University. He has also been recognized by the U.S. Environmental Protection Agency as a “mastermind” for his initiative in helping to create the Industry Cooperative for Ozone Layer Protection (ICOLP).

Awards 
2002 IAEE, Pinnacle Award
2003 National Retail Dealers Association, Lifetime Achievement Award 
2003 Academy of Digital Television Pioneers, HDTV Industry Leadership Award 
2004 The Anti-Defamation League, American Heritage Award 
2004 Lighthouse International, Lifetime Achievement Award 
2008 Bell’O International Take a Bow... Take a Seat Award 
2009 The Media Institute, American Horizon Award 
2009 Washingtonian Magazine, Top Tech Titan 
2009 CEO Update, Top CEO 
2011"The Comeback: How Innovation Will Restore the American Dream" named New York Times bestseller 
2011 Variety's Home Entertainment Hall of Fame 
2012 Washington Life, Washington's Most Influential People 
2013 Washingtonian Magazine, Top Tech Titan 
2013 "Ninja Innovation: The Ten Killer Strategies of the World's Most Successful Businesses" named New York Times bestseller 
2015 DC Inno, 50 on Fire DC Government and Advocacy Winners 
2015 Washingtonian magazine, Top 100 Tech Leaders 
2015 Smart CEO, Washington Healthiest Company 
2016 Virginia Business, Best Places to Work in Virginia  
2017 Washingtonian Magazine, Top Tech Titan 
2017 Northern Virginia Family Service, CARE Award 
2017 The Washington Post, Top Work Places 
2018 Best Work Places for Commuters 
2018 Virginia Business, Best Places to Work 
2018 Washington Magazine, Top Tech Titan 
2019 Trade Show Executive Magazine, TSE Gold Standard in Excellence Award 
2019 International Association of Exhibition and Events, Legend of the Industry 
2020 Northstar Meeting Group, Top 25 Influencers 
2020 The Hill, Top Lobbyists 2020: Associations 
2020 Association Trends Association, Executive of the Year 
2021 The Hill, Top Lobbyists 2021: Associations 
2021 Légion d'Honneur (Legion of Honor) award, Paris, France. Rank of Chevalier

Family
Shapiro divorced and later remarried. He has two sons with his second wife, Susan Malinowski, and two sons from a previous marriage.

Books 
 The Comeback: How Innovation Will Restore the American Dream (2011)
 Ninja Innovation: The Ten Killer Strategies of the World’s Most Successful Businesses (HarperCollins, 2013) ISBN 978-0062242327
Ninja Future: Secrets to Success in the New World of Innovation (2019)

References

External links

 "Why US must rekindle its relationship with Canada, yes Canada", foxnews.com, November 11, 2013; accessed December 8, 2014.

American male writers
American lawyers
American business executives
Binghamton University alumni
Georgetown University Law Center alumni
Living people
Place of birth missing (living people)
1956 births